Wesley Taylor (born August 13, 1986) is an American stage actor and writer, best known for his work in musical theatre and television.

Theatre career
In summer 2008, Taylor performed in Barrington Stage Company's production of the musical See Rock City and Other Destinations. The show won Richard Rodgers and Jerry Bock Awards. Taylor made his Broadway debut in the rock musical Rock of Ages, where he originated the role of the German city developer Franz. He won a Theatre World Award for this role and was nominated for an Outer Critics Circle Award.

His second major role on Broadway was as Lucas Beineke, Wednesday's love interest, in the musical The Addams Family, a role he originated after previously playing the role in the 2009 Chicago production of the show. The show premiered on Broadway in April 2010, with Taylor appearing alongside Krysta Rodriguez, who played Wednesday Addams, Lucas' love interest. He left the role on March 8, 2011.

On March 7, 2011, Taylor played the title role alongside Lauren Molina in a reading for a stage adaptation of Oscar Wilde's The Picture of Dorian Gray, penned by playwright Michael Raver. On April 2, 2011, Taylor, Erin Davie, Ann Harada, Kendrick Jones, and Burke Moses performed the concert, Broadway Tribute in Northport, Long Island at the Engeman Theater. The concert performance featured "the performers re-creating songs they performed on Broadway."

He then starred as Michael "Mouse" Tolliver in the world-premiere musical Tales of the City (based on the book series by Armistead Maupin), which began performances on May 18, 2011 in San Francisco at the American Conservatory Theater, directed by Jason Moore. After three extensions, Tales of the City closed on July 31, 2011.

Taylor played the role of God in An Act of God in 2016 at the Denver Center.  Taylor played the role of Sheldon Plankton opposite Stephanie Hsu as Karen Plankton in the Broadway musical adaptation of SpongeBob SquarePants, which opened on December 4, 2017.  Taylor played the role of The Mad Hatter in Alice by Heart at the Robert W. Wilson MCC Theater, which opened on February 26, 2019.

Other projects
He has appeared on television in One Life to Live, Live! with Regis and Kelly, The Today Show, Good Morning America, and Late Night with Conan O'Brien.  Taylor played Bobby on NBC series Smash. Taylor co-wrote and starred alongside Alex Wyse in the webseries "Indoor Boys", playing the character Luke.

Since early 2009, Taylor and former Rock of Ages co-stars have maintained a YouTube web series titled Billy Green. The series deals with an up-and-coming actor Billy Green, who arrives in New York City but has no idea how to act around established performers, constantly giving away his resume. Billy Greens main cast stars Taylor as Billy and Jackie Hoffman as his over-protective mother. The idea came about during Taylor's senior year at drama school:

... I was looking for a short comic scene for the showcase, our presentation for casting directors and agencies. I could not find anything that I thought was funny enough or not overdone. My classmate E.J. Cantu and I wrote a scene called "The Audition," revolving around a guy named Carson who is auditioning for Death of a Salesman and a clueless, brand-new-to-the-city boy named Billy who sits next to Carson in the waiting room. That sketch became the premise for the pilot of Billy Green.

Taylor also participated in a reading for a play called A Dog's Tale (or The Thing About Getting) at the Kennedy Center. In addition, Taylor has written several short plays: Star-Crossed, The Game, and The Delivery Boy. His latest project, What's So Funny?, received a developmental reading on August 12, 2011, at Ripley-Grier Studios in Manhattan.

Personal life
Taylor was born in Elizabeth, New Jersey, and raised in Orlando, Florida. He is half Puerto Rican, and his parents once resided in China, where they taught at a university: "[I]t's kind of hard for them to come and see the shows I'm in. I always get a little jealous of other people's families ... But my parents – I love them and I totally respect them. They kind of didn't want to settle into being bored in middle age, and they wanted to start over and move to a different country."

Taylor graduated from the theatre magnet at Dr. Phillips High School and holds a Bachelor of Fine Arts in acting from North Carolina School of the Arts. At the latter, Taylor performed as Falstaff in Henry IV, Part 1 and Part 2 and Action in West Side Story.

Taylor is openly gay. In 2016, Taylor met Isaac Cole Powell, when Taylor was visiting his alma mater North Carolina School of the Arts, where Powell was a junior in the school's theatre program. The two then began a relationship in 2017 and were engaged in May 2019. Their relationship ended in 2021.

Theatre credits

Filmography

Films

Television

See also
 LGBT culture in New York City
 List of LGBT people from New York City

References

External links
 
 

1986 births
Living people
21st-century American male actors
American male musical theatre actors
American gay actors
LGBT people from Florida
American people of Puerto Rican descent
Male actors from Florida
Male actors from Orlando, Florida
Theatre World Award winners
Dr. Phillips High School alumni
University of North Carolina School of the Arts alumni
LGBT Hispanic and Latino American people